The 2019 COSAFA Under-17 Championship is the 8th edition of the COSAFA U-17 Championship, an association football tournament organised by the Council of Southern Africa Football Associations (COSAFA) involving teams from Southern Africa for players aged 17 and below.

Participating teams

Officials

Referees 
 Darrio Landry (Seychelles)
 Patience Fidele Rulisa (Rwanda)
 Godfrey Nkhakananga (Malawi)
 Kennedy Chimense (Zambia)
 Thabo Nkhahle (Lesotho)
 Wilson Julio Muianga (Mozambique)
 Masixole Bambiso (South Africa)

Assistant Referees

 Joseph Nyauti (Malawi)
 Rosario Calembela  (Angola)
 Aswet Teeluck (Mauritius)
 Lucky Kegakologetswe (Botswana)
 Thwala Banele (Eswatini)
 Mlungisi Mathuthu (Zimbabwe)
 Matheus Nevonga (Namibia)

Venues
The tournament was played in Blantyre : Mpira Stadium and Kamuzu Stadium

Group stage
All times are local, MUT (UTC+2).

Group A

Group B

Knockout stage

Semi-finals

Third place match

Final

Champion

References 

COSAFA Under-17 Championship
2019 in African football
International association football competitions hosted by Malawi